Valérie Gay (born 6 February 1968) is a retired French para table tennis player. She competed internationally in team events with Fanny Bertrand, Isabelle Lafaye and Stéphanie Mariage.

References

1968 births
Living people
Paralympic table tennis players of France
Table tennis players at the 2004 Summer Paralympics
French female table tennis players
20th-century French women
21st-century French women